Festuca vivipara, the viviparous sheep's-fescue, is a species of grass native to northern Europe, northern Asia, and subarctic North America. The specific epithet vivipara is Latin, referring to the florets' alteration to leafy tufts. The plant can have a diploid number of 28, 49, 56, or 63, though numbers of 21, 35, and 42 have also been reported.

Description
The plant grows in dense tufts. The internodes are glabrous or somewhat puberulent. Dead leaf sheaths either persist or shred into fibers, while living sheaths are tinged purple and have a prominent midvein. The auricle is occasionally marked by a distinct swelling. In the cross-section, sclerenchyma are arranged in three large bundles and up to four smaller bundles, with adaxial sclerenchyma either somewhat developed along the margin to a thick subepidermal band. The glumes are much shorter than the spikelets and have erose margins. The paleas are absent or reduced. Lodicules are toothed when present and lack hairs.

The grass flowers from July into early August.

Distribution and habitat
Festuca vivipara occurs in North America from Greenland and Labrador to Alaska, growing on calcareous rock and peat, and can occur in western Newfoundland, the Shickshock Mountains, and parts of Quebec. Elsewhere, the grass occurs in northern Europe and Russia near lakes and streams.

Subspecies
 Festuca vivipara ssp. glabra
 Festuca vivipara ssp. hirsuta

References

External links

vivipara
Plants described in 1753
Taxa named by Carl Linnaeus
Flora of Subarctic America
Flora of Northern Canada
Flora of Alaska
Flora of Norway
Flora of Finland
Flora of Siberia
Flora of North America
Flora without expected TNC conservation status